(God so loved the world), 68, is a cantata by Johann Sebastian Bach, a church cantata for the second day of Pentecost. Bach composed the cantata in Leipzig and first performed it on 21 May 1725. It is one of nine cantatas on texts by Christiana Mariana von Ziegler, which Bach composed at the end of his second annual cycle of cantatas in Leipzig. In a unique structure among Bach's church cantatas, it begins with a chorale and ends with a complex choral movement on a quotation from the Gospel of John. Bach derived the two arias from his Hunting Cantata.

History and words 

Bach composed the cantata during his second year in Leipzig for Pentecost Monday. The prescribed readings for the feast day were taken from the Acts of the Apostles, the sermon of Saint Peter for Cornelius, and the Gospel of John, "God so loved the world" from the meeting of Jesus and Nicodemus.

In his second year in Leipzig, Bach composed chorale cantatas between the first Sunday after Trinity and Palm Sunday, but for Easter returned to cantatas on more varied texts, possibly because he lost his librettist. Nine of his cantatas for the period between Easter and Pentecost are based on texts by Christiana Mariana von Ziegler, including this cantata. Bach had possibly commissioned the texts in 1724 with his first cantata cycle in mind, but he did not set music to them until 1725. The poet opened the cantata in an unusual way with the first stanza from Salomo Liscow's hymn (1675). It is close to the beginning of the Gospel: "For God so loved the world, that he gave his only begotten Son, that whosoever believeth in him should not perish, but have everlasting life". In the final movement, she quoted verse 18 from the Gospel, set by Bach as an unusual choral movement.

Bach first performed the cantata on 21 May 1725.

Structure and instrumentation 

The cantata in five movements is scored for two soloists, soprano and bass, a four-part choir, horn, cornett, three trombones, two oboes, taille (tenor oboe), two violins, viola, violoncello piccolo and basso continuo.

 Chorus: 
 Aria (soprano): 
 Recitative (bass): 
 Aria (bass): 
 Chorus:

Music 

The opening chorus is a chorale fantasia, as in Bach's chorale cantatas. The hymn melody by Gottfried Vopelius (1682) is sung by the soprano, doubled by a horn. Bach changed the rhythm of the tune from the original common time to 12/8. The musicologist Julian Mincham notes that he "embellishes it to a degree whereby 'it hardly seems like a chorale any more.

The two arias are based on arias from Bach's 1713 Hunting Cantata. The soprano aria "" (My faithful heart) resembles the former aria of the shepherd goddess Pales "" (While the herds all woolly-coated). In the church cantata, Bach used an obbligato violoncello piccolo, an instrument he experimented with in cantatas of the second cantata cycle (1724–25). John Eliot Gardiner describes it as "surely one of Bach's most refreshing and unbuttoned expressions of melodic joy and high spirits". The bass aria is based on the aria of the god Pan, "" (A prince is his own country's Pan). Klaus Hofmann notes that the "splendid wind writing gives some hint of the pathos with which Pan ... is portrayed in Bach's hunting music".

The final movement is not, as in many church cantatas, a simple four-part chorale, but a motet-like structure which conveys a verse from the Gospel of John. The juxtaposition of "" (Whoever believes in Him) and "" (but whoever does not believe) is expressed by a double fugue with two contrasting themes. The voices are doubled by a choir of trombones. Gardiner comments:

Recordings 

 Bach Made in Germany Vol. 2 – Cantatas IV, Kurt Thomas, Thomanerchor, Gewandhausorchester, Elisabeth Grümmer, Theo Adam, Eterna 1960
 J. S. Bach: Cantatas BWV 68 & BWV 70, Kurt Thomas, Kantorei der Dreikönigskirche Frankfurt, Collegium Musicum, Ingeborg Reichelt, Erich Wenk, L’Oiseau-Lyre 1962?
 Les Grandes Cantates de J.S. Bach Vol. 14, Fritz Werner, Heinrich-Schütz-Chor Heilbronn, Pforzheim Chamber Orchestra, Agnes Giebel, Jakob Stämpfli, Erato 1963
 J. S. Bach: Erschallet, ihr Lieder, Kantate BWV 172; Also hat Gott die Welt geliebt, Kantate BWV 68, Klaus Martin Ziegler, Vocalensemble Kassel, Deutsche Bachsolisten, Ursula Buckel, Jakob Stämpfli, Cantate 1966
 Bach Cantatas Vol. 3 – Ascension Day, Whitsun, Trinity’, Karl Richter, Münchener Bach-Chor, Münchener Bach-Orchester, Edith Mathis, Dietrich Fischer-Dieskau, Archiv Produktion 1975
 J. S. Bach: Das Kantatenwerk · Complete Cantatas · Les Cantates, Folge / Vol. 17 – BWV 65–68, Nikolaus Harnoncourt, Tölzer Knabenchor, Concentus Musicus Wien, soloist of the Tölzer Knabenchor, Ruud van der Meer, Teldec 1975
 Die Bach Kantate Vol. 37, Helmuth Rilling, Gächinger Kantorei, Bach-Collegium Stuttgart, Arleen Augér, Philippe Huttenlocher, Hänssler 1981
 Bach Made in Germany Vol. 4 – Cantatas II, Hans-Joachim Rotzsch, Thomanerchor, Gewandhausorchester, Arleen Augér, Theo Adam, Leipzig Classics 1981
 J. S. Bach: Cantatas with Violoncelle Piccolo, Christophe Coin, Chœur de Chambre Accentus, Ensemble Baroque de Limoges, Barbara Schlick, Gotthold Schwarz, Auvidis Astrée 1995
 Bach Cantatas Vol. 26: Long Melford / For Whit Sunday / For Whit Monday, John Eliot Gardiner, Monteverdi Choir, English Baroque Soloists, Lisa Larsson, Panajotis Iconomou, Soli Deo Gloria 2000
 Bach Edition Vol. 21 – Cantatas Vol. 12, Pieter Jan Leusink, Holland Boys Choir, Netherlands Bach Collegium, Marjon Strijk, Bas Ramselaar, Brilliant Classics 2000
 J. S. Bach: Complete Cantatas Vol. 14, Ton Koopman, Amsterdam Baroque Orchestra & Choir, Deborah York, Klaus Mertens, Antoine Marchand 2001
 J. S. Bach: Cantatas Vol. 39 – BWV 28, 68, 85, 175, 183, Masaaki Suzuki, Bach Collegium Japan, Carolyn Sampson, Peter Kooy, BIS 2007
 J. S. Bach: Himmelfahrts-Oratorium, Philippe Herreweghe, Collegium Vocale Gent, Dorothee Mields, Stephan MacLeod, Rapidshare 2008

References

Sources 
 
 Also hat Gott die Welt geliebt BWV 68; BC A 86 / Sacred cantata (2nd Day of Pentecost) Bach Digital
 Cantata BWV 68 Also hat Gott die Welt geliebt history, scoring, sources for text and music, translations to various languages, discography, discussion, Bach Cantatas Website
 BWV 68 Also hat Gott die Welt geliebt English translation, University of Vermont
 BWV 68 Also hat Gott die Welt geliebt text, scoring, University of Alberta

Church cantatas by Johann Sebastian Bach
1725 compositions